Rémi Bonfils (born 26 September 1988 in Paris, France) is a French rugby union player. He plays at hooker for Stade Français in the Top 14.

References

External links
Stade Français Profile
Ligue Nationale De Rugby Profile
European Professional Club Rugby Profile

Living people
1988 births
Rugby union players from Paris
French rugby union players
France international rugby union players
Rugby union hookers